Love, How Bad You Are is a 1953 Mexican crime film directed by José Díaz Morales and starring Emilio Tuero, Emilia Guiú and José María Linares-Rivas.

Cast
 Emilio Tuero as Carlos Durán
 Emilia Guiú as Norka Olguín  
 José María Linares-Rivas as El filántropo  
 Evangelina Elizondo as Lilia de la Cueva 
 Arturo Martínez as Gángter  
 Mario Ruiz Armengol as Johnny  
 Rosario Gálvez 
 Luis Aragón as Jefe de policía  
 Eduardo Acuña as Bartender  
 Manuel Casanueva
 Rogelio Fernández
 José Luis Rojas

References

Bibliography 
 David Pierce. Motion Picture Copyrights & Renewals, 1950-1959. Milestone, 1989.

External links 
 

1953 films
1953 crime drama films
Mexican crime drama films
1950s Spanish-language films
Films directed by José Díaz Morales
Mexican black-and-white films
1950s Mexican films